Hydrothassa hannoveriana is a species of leaf beetle in the family Chrysomelinae. It is found in Europe.

Description
Hydrothassa hannoveriana grows to 3.5 - 5.0mm in length and are dark metallic blue and orange-yellow or reddish in colour. The elytra are coloured yellowish in median longitudinal strips. These elytral marks may fuse, especially at the rear in females; the median stripe may also be broken or absent. The species may be confused with H. glabra or H. marginella.

Habitat
It has various host plants, especially buttercups and marsh-marigolds.

Distribution
H. hannoveriana have a scattered distribution in central and northern Europe. In the United Kingdom it is designated as 'Nationally Scarce' and categorised by the IUCN criteria "vulnerable".

References

External links

 List of references for Hydrothassa hannoveriana (Fabricius, 1775) at Biodiversity Heritage Library

Beetles of Europe
Beetles described in 1775
Taxa named by Johan Christian Fabricius
Chrysomelinae